Sergey Yevgenievich Mokhnatkin (March 6, 1954 —  May 28, 2020) was a Russian political activist and human rights activist.

On December 31, 2009, Mokhnatkin was arrested while participating in the Strategy-31 protest action on Triumfalnaya Square in Moscow (he was accused of beating up an officer of the 2nd operational police regiment of the Main Internal Affairs Directorate in Moscow, police sergeant Dmitry Moiseyev) and was sentenced to 2 years 6 months in a general regime colony. While in the colony, Mokhnatkin defended his rights and the rights of other prisoners, for which he was repeatedly subjected to unlawful punishments. The Russian human rights community recognized him as a political prisoner.

On April 21, 2012, Mokhnatkin was pardoned without admitting guilt by the decree of the President of the Russian Federation Dmitry Medvedev. After the pardon, Mokhnatkin continued his human rights activities and participation in protest actions.

In December 2014, Mokhnatkin was again convicted on charges of using violence against a government official. In 2016, he was also convicted on charges of insulting a government official, and in 2017 on charges of disrupting the work of the colony.  In prison, Mokhnatkin received a spinal injury. He developed complications after an injury sustained during his stay in correctional colony No. 4 in the city of Arkhangelsk. The FSIN officers broke his spine.

In December 2018, Mokhnatkin was released, but at the end of 2019, due to the consequences of an injury, he lost the ability to walk, was hospitalized and operated on. Mokhnatkin spent the next several months in the hospital. On May 28, 2020, he died due to complications after surgery.

References

External links 
 Блог Сергея Мохнаткина на радио «Эхо Москвы»

1954 births
2020 deaths
Russian dissidents
Russian human rights activists
Amnesty International prisoners of conscience held by Russia
People from Izhevsk